Orchadocarpa is a genus of flowering plants belonging to the family Gesneriaceae.

Its native range is the Malaysian Peninsula.

Species
Species:
 Orchadocarpa lilacina Ridl.

References

Didymocarpoideae
Gesneriaceae genera